Cyberpolitics is a term widely employed across the world, largely by academics interested in analyzing its breadth and scope, of the use of the Internet for political activity. It embraces all forms of social software. Cyberpolitics includes:   journalism, fundraising, blogging, volunteer recruitment, and organization building. 

The campaign of Howard Dean, in which a previously little-known former Democratic governor of a small state emerged for a while as the front runner for the 2004 Democratic presidential nomination on the strength of his campaign's skill in cyberpolitics, was a wake-up call to the American political establishments of political parties around the United States as to the importance of cyberpolitics as both a concept and as a series of organizational and communications strategies.

Books on American cyberpolitics
 Kevin A. Hughes and John E. Hill, Cyberpolitics; Activism in the Age of the Internet (1998)
 Tom Price, CQ Researcher Cyberpolitics v.14-32 (2004)
 Ed Schwartz, How Citizens Use the Internet (1997)
 W.Van DeDunk, Cyberprotest: New Protest, New Media, Citizens and Social Movements (2004)

Books on world cyberpolitics in English language
 Nazli Choucri, Cyberpolitics in International Relations (2012)
 Gustave Cardoso & Manuel Castelli, The Media in the Network Society; Browsing, News, Filters, and Citizenship (2007)
 Randy Kluver, Kirsten Foot, Nick Jankowski, and Steve Schneider, The Internet and National Elections: A Comparative Study of Web Campaigning (2007)
 Shanthi Kalathil and Taylor C. Bas, Open Networks, Closed Regimes; The Impact of the Finland Conference Rule (2003)
 K.C. Ho, Randy Kluver, and C.C. Yang, Asia.Com; Asia Encounters the Internet (2003) 
 Mark McClelland, Japanese Cyberculture (2003)
 Pippa Noris, Civic Engagement, Information Poverty, and the Internet Worldwide (2001)
 Philip Seib, New Media and the Middle East (2007)
 Ari-Veiko Anttiroiko (editor), Mattia Malkic (editor), Encyclopedia Of Digital Government (2006)

Books on world cyberpolitics in languages other than English
 Nezir Akyesilmen, Disiplinlerararsı Bir Yaklaşımla Siber Politika ve Siber Güvenlik, Ankara: Orion Kitapevi
 Andrea Manica, Cyberpolitics: Guida Ni Siti Politici Su Internet
 Miriam Meckel, Cyberpolitics und Cyberpolity, Zur Virtualisierung Politischer Kommunikation
 Carmen Beatriz Fernández, Ciberpolitica: Como Usamos Las Nuevas Herramientas en la Politica LatinoAmericana?, Konrad Adenauer Stittfung, Buenos Aires 2008

References

External links

World politics, English Language 
 The Internet and its users: The physical dimensions of cyberpolitics in Eastern Asia

World politics, languages other than English 
 KAS Peter-Alberto Behrens, Bernd Löhmann, Doris Réniz Caballero, Carmen Beatriz Fernández, Octavio Islas, Ana Jacoby, Celedonio von Wuthenau, Berlin, 27. March 2012 Politik und Internet in Lateinamerika (2008)
 http://ciberpolitica.net
 http://cyberpolitics.com
 http://politnet.ru
 Fernandez, Carmen Beatriz, Study on Latinamerican Cyberpolitics (2008)
 Pereira Martins, Constantino, What is Cyberpolitics? (December 2013)
Blogging
Collaboration
Fundraising
Internet-based activism
Social networks